"Misty Mountain Hop" is a song by English rock band Led Zeppelin, released in 1971 by Atlantic Records. The song appears on the band's untitled fourth album, and was released as the B-side to the single "Black Dog" and performed in most of the band's 1972 and 1973 concert tours. In 2019, Rolling Stone ranked the song number 10 on its list of the 40 greatest Led Zeppelin songs.

Lyrics and recording
The most common interpretation of the song's title involves a reference to the Misty Mountains in J. R. R. Tolkien's The Hobbit. The lyrics refer to the events of the 7 July 1968 "Legalise Pot Rally" in Hyde Park, London, in which police made arrests for marijuana possession. The lyrics reflect Plant's quest for a better society, a place and time when hangups are replaced with individual freedom and a life of mutual support and rapport.

The song was recorded at Headley Grange, a mansion where the band sometimes lived in Hampshire, England.

Releases and versions
The song was released as the B-side to the single "Black Dog", which was released in the United States on 2 December 1971, continental Europe (the United Kingdom did not receive the single release), and Australia.

A different version of this song is featured on the second disc of the remastered two CD deluxe edition of Led Zeppelin IV.

Live performances
The band performed the song at the 3 May 1971 Copenhagen concert (song's first concert performance) and then at the 1972 and 1973 concert tours. Band member Robert Plant performed it for most of his own solo concerts since the 1980 band breakup. Plant also performed it with the surviving members of the band at the 10 December 2007 tribute concert for Ahmet Ertegun.

See also
List of cover versions of Led Zeppelin songs"Misty Mountain Hop" entries

References

1971 singles
Atlantic Records singles
Led Zeppelin songs
Music based on Middle-earth
Songs about cannabis
Songs based on actual events
Songs written by Jimmy Page
Songs written by Robert Plant
Songs written by John Paul Jones (musician)
Song recordings produced by Jimmy Page
1971 songs